John Landon (November 9, 1833March 13, 1871) was a Michigan politician.

Early life
John Landon was on November 9, 1833 in Cayuga County, New York born to parents Hermon (also spelled Harmon) and Betsey Landon. John, along with his father's family, moved to Springport, Michigan in 1835.

Career and death
On November 8, 1864, Landon was elected to the Michigan House of Representatives where he represented the Jackson County 3rd district from January 4, 1865 to December 31, 1866. On November 4, 1870, Landon was again elected to the state house where he represented the same district until his death in office on March 13, 1871. Landon was interred at Campbell Cemetery in Parma, Michigan. His funeral was attended by eight fellow representatives who served as pallbearers. Also attending his funeral was the clerk of the state house, and the speaker of the state house, Jonathan J. Woodman.

References

1833 births
1871 deaths
Burials in Michigan
People from Cayuga County, New York
People from Jackson County, Michigan
Republican Party members of the Michigan House of Representatives
19th-century American politicians